Ena votsalo sti limni is a 1955 Greek comedy film directed by Giorgos Tzavelas and stars Vassilis Logothetidis and Ilya Livykou

Plot

A miserly man cheats his wife one night. A series from misunderstandings ensue that will entirely change his life.

Cast

Vasilis Logothetidis - as Manolis Skountris
Ilya Livykou - as Evelyn
Mary Lalopoulou - as Veta Skountri
Vangelis Protopappas - as Giorgos (Yiorgos) Karanasos
Kaiti Lambropoulou - as Margaret
Stefanos Stratigos - as Vangelis

External links

Ena votsalo sto limni at cine.gr

1952 films
1955 comedy films
1955 films
1950s Greek-language films
Greek comedy films
Greek black-and-white films